Stygiomedusa gigantea, commonly known as the giant phantom jelly, is a part of the monotypic genus of deep sea jellyfish, Stygiomedusa. It is in the Ulmaridae family. With only around 110 sightings in 110 years, it is a jellyfish that is rarely seen, but believed to be widespread throughout the world, with the exception of the Arctic Ocean.

The Monterey Bay Aquarium Research Institute's remotely operated underwater vehicles have only sighted the jelly 27 times in 27 years. A study conducted by the Journal of the Marine Biological Association of the United Kingdom, focusing on four Stygiomedusa gigantea present in the Gulf of Mexico, revealed information regarding the wider distribution of this species. S. gigantea is thought to be one of the largest invertebrate predators in the ecosystem.

Appearance
S. gigantea has an umbrella-shaped bell that can grow up to .The bell's pliant tissue allows for the jellyfish to stretch 4 to 5 times its size, presumably to engulf their prey. The arms grow in a "V" shape transversely, with a wider base and tapering towards the ends. They do not have any stinging tentacles and instead use their arms to trap and engulf their prey which consists of plankton and small fish. From Browne's analysis of a collected S. gigantea, their jelly appears a red-orange color only when there is visible light. However, since they dwell in the deep ocean, visible light does not penetrate far enough. Thus, the giant jellyfish may appear "invisible" or glow orange very faintly in its surroundings, depending on the depth of the water. 
The circular stomach contained canals that travel to the surface of the sub-umbrella. It is inferred that the lower stomach is thick to ensure the species has the strength to carry their long arms. Its four genital openings were also small to avoid weakening the stomach. Since there were no gastric pouches nor radial canals, the jellyfish was determined to be a part of the Ulmaridae family.

Behavior
Known to be one of the largest invertebrate predators in the deep sea, the giant phantom jellyfish's typical prey consists of plankton and small fish. The S. gigantea tends to be more dominant in locations with a low productivity system, which in turn deters other predatory organisms, like fish, to high productivity systems (coastal, upwelling zones). However, the jellyfish remains an important predator for the deep sea, often competing with squids and whales. 

Larger S. gigantea have also been observed to be in the immediate vicinity of hydrothermal vents where large proportions of zooplankton are abundant. This is in mesopelagic and bathypelagic depths. The further away from hydrothermal vents, the smaller the medusa are—indicating that zooplankton are an important resource for the species. Due to this, the medusae are well off during early spring to early summer when zooplankton biomass is enhanced.

Evidence has been collected to support the first-ever documented symbiotic relationship for an ophidiiform fish, Thalassobathia pelagica. Scientists have observed that the large umbrella-shaped bell of S. gigantea provides food and shelter for T. pelagica, while the fish aids the giant phantom jelly by removing parasites. The S. giganteas jelly providing shelter for T. pelagica is essential for the fish, considering the lack of shelter resources at such extreme ocean depths. Studies to further support this symbiotic relationship have shown that the two species reassociate with one another even if separated. It was inferred that T. pelagica is able to find its way back to the giant phantom jelly due to neuromasts that increase the sensitivity of low-frequency water movements—which the bell of the jellyfish emits.

Discovery
The first S. gigantea specimen, weighing in at ninety pounds, was collected in 1899, but it was not recognized as a species until 1959. Despite having discovered only 118 individuals within 110 years (1899–2009), gelatinous mucus from the medusa have been found covering vents, indicating they may travel in swarms. Similar large jelly Schyphomedusae were observed traveling in swarms off the West coast of North America.

The giant phantom jelly occurs all around the world with the exception of the Arctic Ocean. They are typically found 61°N–75°S and 135°W–153°E. In areas of high latitude in the Southern ocean, the depth at which the species may be found are at the mesopelagic and epipelagic levels. However, in areas of mid to low latitude, the species are typically found at bathypelagic and mesopelagic levels. This is due to the variability of the ocean's temperature and light distribution.

Reproduction

Determining the reproduction of the S. gigantea is difficult considering how rare sightings are. It has been noted that young captured S. gigantea looked like an exact miniature' of the adult. However, researchers have analyzed the jellyfish's structure and anatomy enough to understand how it may reproduce. 
The S. gigantea has four brood chambers that protrude into the stomach in folded narrow ridges and epithelium that covers the gastric side. Above this band, there is a germinal line that forms a shallow groove with different epithelial cells that are more cubical in shape with large, rounded nuclei. Irregular placement of the cells in small pits (small clumps of cells, similar to cyst) along the germinal line produce a multiplication of epithelial cells that create a deep invagination. This is the first stage leading to the reproduction of S. gigantea. The cyst grows with a pointed end on the subumbrella side. As its size increases, it pushes out the brood chamber wall and into the cavity of the chamber. Simultaneously on the opposite end, two outgrowths develop horizontally, making the cyst into a "T" shape. This protrudes more and more as size increases, taking the brood chamber with it. Eventually, a thin membrane forms and the cyst enters the stomach cavity.

Within the cyst, a scyphistoma—a single developing medusa—forms and is now called a chorion. Within the chorion capsule, differentiation and formation begins. The inner epithelial wall is directly from the parent tissue and is pocketed into its distal tips that will eventually become the S. giganteas arms. As the "baby" medusa grows, it takes the shape of the capsule.

In order to escape, the well-developed "baby" medusa will detach from the subumbrella wall where it was already slightly protruding. It then exits through the gastric cavity and out the parent's mouth.

The baby medusa soon become free-swimming planules, then polyps or scyphistomae that reproduce asexually through budding or podocysts. These are what become larval medusae that feed on plankton. Eventually, it will grow into the size of an adult. It is inferred that reproduction of S. gigantea is continuous with one parent estimated to produce fifty to one hundred medusa.

References

External links
Giant phantom jelly - Monterey Bay Aquarium Research Institute
Giant, cryptic ocean dweller filmed roaming the deep sea - "Mashable"
Rare monster jellyfish caught on tape – Discovery Channel
Distribution of Stygiomedusa gigantea – Ocean Biodiversity Information System

Ulmaridae
Scyphozoan genera
Cnidarians of the Pacific Ocean
Cnidarians of the Caribbean Sea
Marine fauna of Asia
Marine fauna of North America
Marine fauna of the Gulf of California
Western North American coastal fauna
Fauna of California
Animals described in 1910